Sardinia is a village in Brown and Highland counties in the U.S. state of Ohio. The population was 980 at the 2010 census.

History

Sardinia was laid out in 1833. The village's name is derived from the homonymous island in the Mediterranean Sea. In 1860, Sardinia's population was 200 and Washington Township had a population of 1,300. It was a station on the Cincinnati & Eastern Railroad, today the Cincinnati Eastern Railroad (CCET).

Geography
Sardinia is located mostly in Washington Township in Brown County, and partly in Clay Township in southwestern Highland County, at  (39.008718, -83.804213),

Demographics

2010 census
As of the census of 2010, there were 980 people, 363 households, and 259 families living in the village. The racial makeup of the village was 99.2% White, 0.2% African American, 0.3% Native American, 0.1% from other races, and 0.2% from two or more races. Hispanic or Latino of any race were 0.3% of the population.

There were 363 households, of which 44.9% had children under the age of 18 living with them, 42.1% were married couples living together, 21.5% had a female householder with no husband present, 7.7% had a male householder with no wife present, and 28.7% were non-families. 24.0% of all households were made up of individuals, and 8.6% had someone living alone who was 65 years of age or older. The average household size was 2.67 and the average family size was 3.07.

The median age in the village was 31 years. 33.1% of residents were under the age of 18; 8.1% were between the ages of 18 and 24; 28.6% were from 25 to 44; 20.3% were from 45 to 64; and 9.9% were 65 years of age or older. The gender makeup of the village was 46.3% male and 53.7% female.

2000 census
As of the census of 2000, there were 862 people, 328 households, and 230 families living in the village. The population density was 1,343.8 people per square mile (520.0/km). There were 362 housing units at an average density of 564.3 per square mile (218.4/km). The racial makeup of the village was 98.61% White, 0.23% Black or African American, and 1.16% from two or more races. Hispanic or Latino of any race were 0.93% of the population.

There were 328 households, out of which 40.5% had children under the age of 18 living with them, 51.5% were married couples living together, 13.4% had a female householder with no husband present, and 29.6% were non-families. 26.8% of all households were made up of individuals, and 13.7% had someone living alone who was 65 years of age or older. The average household size was 2.54 and the average family size was 3.06.

In the village, the population was spread out, with 29.0% under the age of 18, 9.5% from 18 to 24, 31.7% from 25 to 44, 17.3% from 45 to 64, and 12.5% who were 65 years of age or older. The median age was 31 years. For every 100 females there were 87.8 males. For every 100 females age 18 and over, there were 81.1 males.

The median income for a household in the village was $28,897, and the median income for a family was $32,708. Males had a median income of $34,375 versus $18,056 for females. The per capita income for the village was $12,334. About 15.4% of families and 20.1% of the population were well above the poverty line, including 24.2% of those under age 18 and 14.3% of those age 65 or over.

Education
The village is served by Eastern High School. Sardinia has a public library, a branch of the Brown County Public Library.

References

External links
 Village of Sardinia official website
 Eastern Brown Local Schools
 Southern State Community College

Villages in Brown County, Ohio
Villages in Highland County, Ohio
Villages in Ohio
1830 establishments in Ohio
Populated places established in 1830